Yau is a Torricelli language of Papua New Guinea. It is spoken in Senim village of Tabale ward, East Wapei Rural LLG, Sandaun Province.

References

Wapei languages
Languages of Sandaun Province